The University of California, San Francisco Medical Center is a research and teaching hospital in San Francisco, California and is the medical center of the University of California, San Francisco. It is affiliated with the UCSF School of Medicine. In 2022–23, it was ranked as the 12th-best overall hospital in the United States and one of the top three hospital in California by U.S. News & World Report.

It was founded in 1907 at the site of Parnassus Heights, on Mount Sutro, following the 1906 earthquake, and it was the first hospital in the University of California system. The university acquired Mount Zion Hospital in 1990, which became the second major clinical site and since 1999 has hosted the first comprehensive cancer center in Northern California. Beginning in 2001, the university expanded in the Mission Bay neighborhood and added a new medical center with three new hospitals.

History 
The UCSF medical center opened as a hospital in 1907 with 75 beds, after the 1906 San Francisco earthquake made it necessary to expand healthcare in the city.  In 1949, the UC Hospital was officially renamed "University of California Medical Center."

Mount Zion Hospital opened its doors in 1897 merged with UCSF in 1990.

The medical center received a philanthropic donation of $100 million from Chuck Feeney in February 2015, the largest gift by an individual in the history of the UC system. In 2018, UCSF received a commitment of $500 million for the construction of a new hospital, which will be built at Parnassus, replacing the Langley Porter Psychiatric Institute.

Facilities

Parnassus 
UCSF Helen Diller Medical Center at Parnassus Heights is located on the main campus of UCSF and includes the 600-bed teaching hospital of the same name along with the Langley Porter Psychiatric Institute, extensive research labs, the main branch of the UCSF Library, and is home to the UCSF School of Medicine, UCSF School of Nursing, UCSF School of Dentistry, and UCSF School of Pharmacy.

In June 2013, Becker's Hospital Review listed the UCSF Medical Center at Parnassus as the 9th highest grossing hospital in America with a gross revenue of $6.88 billion.

Mission Bay 

UCSF Medical Center at Mission Bay opened February 1, 2015 and hosts three hospitals (UCSF Benioff Children's Hospital, UCSF Betty Irene Moore Women's Hospital, and UCSF Bakar Cancer Hospital) and an outpatient facility. Overall, the 6-story medical center covers 878,000-square-foot and has 289 beds. It also has 4.3 acres of green space, including 
100,000 square feet of ground landscaping and 60,000 square feet of rooftop gardens.

Mount Zion 
Mount Zion Hospital was planned in 1887 by members of the Jewish community in San Francisco. It opened its doors in 1897 and gradually became a major center of medical research. It merged with UCSF in 1990. UCSF Medical Center at Mount Zion now hosts specialty clinics, including the UCSF Comprehensive Cancer Center and the Women's Health Center. Mount Zion includes a Surgery Center with 10 operating rooms and 90 beds.

Rankings 
In 2022–23, UCSF Medical Center was ranked as the third best hospital in California (standing behind Cedars-Sinai Medical Center and UCLA Medical Center, which are both located in Los Angeles) by the U.S. News & World Report. UCSF received following ranking in 16 adult medical specialities:

See also

Medical centers in the United States
UCSF Benioff Children's Hospital

References

External links
Official website
This hospital in the CA Healthcare Atlas A project by OSHPD

Teaching hospitals in California
Hospitals in San Francisco
University of California, San Francisco
Anshen and Allen buildings
Hospital networks in the United States
Hospitals established in 1907
Academic health science centres